Hobøl was a municipality in Østfold county, Norway. The administrative centre of the municipality was the village of Elvestad. The parish of Haabøl was established as a municipality on 1 January 1838 (see formannskapsdistrikt).

The largest village in Hobøl was Tomter, whose railway station is served by Eastern Østfold Line.  Other villages in the municipality were Knapstad, Ringvoll, and the middle part of the municipality which is called Hobøl.

Hobøl was suggested as the replacement site for a new airport to replace Fornebu, and in 1972 the Norwegian parliament voted to build it there. The 1973 oil crisis postponed that plan, and the new airport was finally built at Gardermoen, north of Oslo.

General information

Name
The municipality (originally the parish) is named after the old Hobøl farm (Old Norse: Hóbœli), since the first church was built here. The first element is hór or hár meaning "high". The last element is bœli which means "farm". Thus the name means "the farm lying on a high ground".  Prior to 1889 the name was written "Haabøl".

Coat-of-arms
The Coat-of-arms is from modern times.  It was granted on 30 August 1985; it shows the municipality as seen from above. The municipality is mainly formed by a large valley, cut by the meandering Hobølelva river.

Notable people

Sister cities
The following cities are twinned with Hobøl:
  - Rõngu, Tartu County, Estonia

References

External links

Municipal fact sheet from Statistics Norway

 
Municipalities of Østfold
Villages in Østfold